Liu Lu (born 19 March 1977) was a former Chinese badminton player. She was part of the national team that clinched an Uber Cup in 1998 Hong Kong. In the individual events, she participated at the 1994 World Junior Championships clinched a gold medal in the girls' doubles event partnered with Yao Jie. Teamed-up with Qian Hong, she won the women's doubles title at the 1996 Scottish Open and 1997 Swedish Open. Liu also won a gold and a silver medal at the 1997 Asian Championships in the mixed doubles event with Zhang Jun, and in the women's doubles with Qian respectively. Liu and Qian also settled for a bronze medal at the 1997 World Championships. In January 1998, she was recorded as women's doubles world No. 4 in the IBF world ranking.

Achievements

BWF World Championships 
Women's doubles

Asian Championships 
Women's doubles

Mixed doubles

World Junior Championships 
Girls' doubles

IBF World Grand Prix 
The World Badminton Grand Prix sanctioned by International Badminton Federation (IBF) since 1983.

Women's doubles

IBF International 
Women's doubles

References

External links 
 

1977 births
Living people
People from Yichang
Badminton players from Hubei
Chinese female badminton players